John Henry Doscher, Jr. (July 27, 1880 – May 27, 1971) was an American left-handed pitcher in Major League Baseball from 1903 to 1908. Born in Troy, New York, he played for the Cincinnati Reds, Brooklyn Superbas, and Chicago Cubs. His father Herm Doscher had also been a major league player, as well as an umpire. Doscher is the first son of a former Major League player to play in the Major Leagues. Jack Doscher died in Park Ridge, New Jersey at age 90.

See also
List of second-generation Major League Baseball players

References

External links

1880 births
1971 deaths
Major League Baseball pitchers
Cincinnati Reds players
Brooklyn Superbas players
Chicago Cubs players
Baseball players from New York (state)
Columbus Senators players
Anderson Anders players
Fort Wayne Indians players
Saginaw Salt Eaters players
Indianapolis Hoosiers (minor league) players
Minneapolis Millers (baseball) players
Anderson (minor league baseball) players
Troy Trojans (minor league) players
Harrisburg Senators players
Jersey City Skeeters players
Atlanta Crackers players
Newark Bears (IL) players
Fordham Rams baseball players
Plattsburgh (baseball) players